Doctor Mordrid is a 1992 American superhero film directed by the team of Albert and Charles Band and starring Jeffrey Combs.

Plot
Anton Mordrid (Combs) is a wizard sent to Earth by a being called the Monitor, to stop the evil wizard Kabal from opening the gate to Hell. Kabal needs the Philosopher's Stone and several alchemical elements to complete the spell and open the gate, unleashing his minions from the Fourth Dimension upon the Earth. Mordrid watches for signs of Kabal's presence for 150 years; as the time of their epic battle approaches, Mordrid assumes the role of a criminal psychologist, and becomes the mysterious landlord to Samantha Hunt, a research consultant to the police.

Dr. Mordrid detects a series of thefts of the elements that Kabal is seeking, and Mordrid begins to search for his nemesis. Samantha is persistent in her attempts to penetrate Mordrid's secretive life. The battle for Earth spills over into the Magic Dimension where the gate is closely guarded by other good wizards. They are no match for Kabal, who defeats all but one of them. This survivor confirms Kabal's plans for Mordrid, and Mordrid returns to Earth to prepare his defenses. When Mordrid is arrested for murder, Samantha attempts to help prove his innocence. Mordrid reveals his true nature and his mission to her, and she agrees to help him escape.

In the final showdown, Kabal and Mordrid do battle within the Cosmopolitan Museum with Kabal animating the Tyrannosaurus skeleton on display to threaten several police officers while he opens the portals to his demonic realm. Mordrid animates a nearby American Mastodon skeleton to battle the dinosaur while he deals with Kabal. Using his wits and his magical power, Mordrid narrowly manages to kill Kabal by having the mastodon impale him on its tusk while he's distracted, preventing the destruction of reality as we know it. His mission accomplished, Mordrid is called by The Monitor to cross over once again into the Magic Dimension and leave the Earth behind. Later that year on Christmas, he returns to Earth and spends time with Samantha, inviting her to come with him should he be called away again.

Cast
 Jeffrey Combs as Dr. Anton Mordrid
 Yvette Nipar as Samantha Hunt
 Jay Acovone as Tony Gaudio
 Keith Coulouris as Adrian
 Ritch Brinkley as Gunner
 Brian Thompson as Kabal
 Pearl Shear as Sara Golden
 Murray Rubin as Mr. Berstein
 Jeff Austin as Detective Levitz
 John Apicella as Morrie
 Julie Michaels as Irene
 Mark Phelan as Officer 1
 Kenn Scott as Officer 2
 Scott Roberts as Fireman
 Steven Marca as Armored Car Driver
 Jonathan Kruger as Newscaster

Production
The film was produced by Charles Band and co-directed by Band and his father, Albert Band.  It was written by C. Courtney Joyner and released by Full Moon Features. The Bands, which previously made successful B-films such as Robot Jox and Re-Animator, had used their influence to get a license to produce a Doctor Strange film from Marvel Entertainment. Pre-production took long enough that by the start of production, the Bands had lost the license. Rather than scrap what they had done, they rebranded the film as Doctor Mordrid and made changes to the plot to avoid the copyright problems with Doctor Strange.. However, according to further sources, the movie would never have had the will to be based on Doctor Strange.

The main character was originally called "Doctor Mortalis" for Empire International Pictures and had concept art made by Jack Kirby.

Legacy
The film was featured on Season 13 of the cult TV series Mystery Science Theater 3000 on June 10, 2022.

References

External links

Official trailer

Full Moon Features films
Films directed by Charles Band
1992 films
1992 fantasy films
1990s superhero films
American superhero films
Films about magic
Film superheroes
Films directed by Albert Band
Films scored by Richard Band
1990s English-language films
1990s American films